Myrickite is a name used for both the agatized and opalized cinnabar materials. With a Mohs hardness of 7, the agatized form is a red-orange with bits of white, whereas the opalized material is orange and black and is 5 on the Mohs hardness scale. Although similar in color, this material should not be confused with the stone from China referred to as "Chicken Blood", as that material is a cinnabar stained serpentine with a hardness of 2.5-4. Unique to the United States, Myrickite is found at only one location in any quantity. During the early 1950s, Myrickite had been found in small quantities at the Manhattan Mine, located in Napa County, California, USA.

The name "Myrickite" is a lapidary term like "Montana Agate" or "Thunder Egg", not a mineral name. In addition, the percentage of mercury (0.01%) in this material is enough to give Myrickite its beautiful coloring. Myrickite is named after Francis Marion "Shady" Myrick who discovered it while prospecting in California's Death Valley in 1911.

References

External links 
 Myrickite (in Chinese)

 Myrickite: Myrickite mineral information and data.
 Geology of the McLaughlin Deposit

Mercury(II) minerals
Quartz varieties